St. Joseph Convent and Academy Complex (also known as Sisters of St. Joseph of the Third Order of St. Francis, Marymount) is a historic church at 12215 Granger Road in Garfield Heights, Ohio.

It was built in 1924 and added to the National Register in 2006.

References

Roman Catholic Diocese of Cleveland
Churches on the National Register of Historic Places in Ohio
Churches in Cuyahoga County, Ohio
National Register of Historic Places in Cuyahoga County, Ohio
Churches in the Roman Catholic Diocese of Cleveland
Historic districts on the National Register of Historic Places in Ohio
1924 establishments in Ohio
Garfield Heights, Ohio